WQAD-TV (channel 8) is a television station licensed to Moline, Illinois, United States, serving the Quad Cities area as an affiliate of ABC and MyNetworkTV. Owned by Tegna Inc., the station maintains studios on Park 16th Street in Moline, and its transmitter is located in Orion, Illinois.

History

WQAD-TV signed on for the first time on August 1, 1963. It was owned by the Moline Television Corporation, a group of 24 local investors. They won the license in 1961; however, concerns about interference with WIRL-TV in Peoria (now TBD owned-and-operated station WHOI) delayed sign-on for two years. Before WQAD signed on, ABC programming had been split between NBC affiliate WOC-TV (channel 6, now KWQC-TV) and CBS affiliate WHBF-TV (channel 4). Viewers with a good antenna could watch the full ABC schedule on KCRG-TV in Cedar Rapids.

From day one, WQAD aired ABC programming in color. Cowles Communications of Des Moines, Iowa purchased WQAD in 1978. In 1985, the Cowles family sold their various media interests, with WQAD going to The New York Times Company. WQAD was branded in the early-1980s as "Active 8, Your 24 Hour News Source" or "The Best News Around" and did hourly news cut-ins even during the overnight hours. WQAD started the "Active 8" branding in 1978 and used this branding until the early 1990s. WQAD was the first television station in the Quad Cities to be on the air 24 hours a day in late 1980.

On January 4, 2007, The New York Times Company sold WQAD and its eight sister television stations to Local TV, a holding company operated by private equity group Oak Hill Capital Partners, for $530 million; the sale was finalized on May 7. On July 1, 2013, the Tribune Company (which formed a management company that operated both its own television stations and those owned by Local TV in 2008) acquired the Local TV stations for $2.75 billion. When the transaction was completed on December 27, it resulted in WQAD becoming a sister station to the company's television flagship, WGN-TV in Chicago.

Aborted sale to Sinclair Broadcast Group
On May 8, 2017, Sinclair Broadcast Group announced it would acquire Tribune Media for $3.9 billion, plus the assumption of $2.7 billion in debt held by Tribune. Had the deal received regulatory approval by the Federal Communications Commission (FCC) and the U.S. Department of Justice's Antitrust Division, the transaction would have brought WQAD under common ownership with several stations owned and/or operated by Sinclair in adjacent markets, including: KGAN/KFXA-TV in Cedar Rapids, KHQA-TV in Quincy, WMSN-TV in Madison, WUCW in Minneapolis–Saint Paul, WVTV/WCGV-TV in Milwaukee (which would have become co-owned with Fox affiliate WITI through the deal as well), and fellow ABC affiliates KTVO in Kirksville–Ottumwa, KDNL-TV in St. Louis (barring a sale to alleviate conflicts with Tribune-owned Fox affiliate KTVI and CW affiliate KPLR-TV), WICS in Springfield (and its satellite station WICD in Champaign), as well as former fellow ABC affiliate WHOI in Peoria (which converted into a Comet O&O in a separate affiliation transaction involving Quincy Media in November 2016).

Less than one month after the FCC voted to have the deal reviewed by an administrative law judge amid "serious concerns" about Sinclair's forthrightness in its applications to sell certain conflict properties, on August 9, 2018, Tribune announced it would terminate the Sinclair deal, intending to seek other M&A opportunities. Tribune also filed a breach of contract lawsuit in the Delaware Chancery Court, alleging that Sinclair engaged in protracted negotiations with the FCC and the Department of Justice (DOJ) over regulatory issues, refused to sell stations in markets where it already had properties, and proposed divestitures to parties with ties to Sinclair executive chair David D. Smith that were rejected or highly subject to rejection to maintain control over stations it was required to sell.

Sale to Tegna

On December 3, 2018, Irving, Texas–based Nexstar Media Group—which has owned CBS affiliate WHBF-TV since March 2014, the CW affiliate KGCW (channel 26) since December 2014 and has operated Fox affiliate KLJB (channel 18) through a shared services agreement (SSA) with Marshall Broadcasting Group in concurrence with the completion of its acquisition of KGCW—announced it would acquire the assets of Tribune Media for $6.4 billion in cash and debt. Nexstar was precluded from acquiring WQAD directly or indirectly, as FCC regulations prohibit common ownership of more than two stations in the same media market, or two or more of the four highest-rated stations in the market. (Furthermore, any attempt by Nexstar to assume the operations of WQAD through local marketing or shared services agreements would have been subject to regulatory hurdles that could have delayed completion of the FCC and Justice Department's review and approval process for the acquisition.) As such, Nexstar would be required to sell either WQAD or both WHBF and KLJB (separately as it would break the grandfathered LMA) to separate, unrelated companies to address the ownership conflict. KGCW could either be retained by Nexstar (tied with either WQAD or WHBF) or sold to the new buyer if WHBF is sold, as KGCW does not rank among the four highest-rated stations in the Quad Cities market.

On March 20, 2019, McLean, Virginia–based Tegna Inc. announced it would purchase WQAD-TV from Nexstar upon consummation of the merger, as part of the company's sale of nineteen Nexstar- and Tribune-operated stations to Tegna and the E. W. Scripps Company in separate deals worth $1.32 billion; this would make WQAD the first television property in Iowa for Tegna and its first television property in Illinois since the group (under its pre-2016-split structure as the broadcasting arm of the Gannett Company) sold WREX in Rockford, Illinois to the Gilmore Broadcasting Corporation in 1969. The sale of WQAD to Tegna was completed on September 19, 2019.

WQAD-DT3
WQAD-DT3 is the MyNetworkTV-affiliated third digital subchannel of WQAD-TV, broadcasting in 720p high definition on UHF channel 38.3 (or virtual channel 8.3 via PSIP).

History
The history of WQAD-DT3 dates back to sometime in 2001, when Northwest Television, the original owner of Galesburg-licensed WMWC-TV, had applied for a license to broadcast a digital signal on channel 53 and had planned to sign on September 1 the same year, as the UPN affiliate for the Quad Cities television market, with operations for the proposed station to be handled by Second Generation of Iowa, owner of Fox affiliate KFXA in Cedar Rapids. However, the application for the new station was challenged by Grant Broadcasting System II, then-owner of KLJB-TV and KGWB-TV. In May 2002, after receiving permission to begin broadcasting an analog signal on UHF channel 26, the predecessor of this digital subchannel station began transmitter tests and on June 1, signed on as WBQD-LP with the UPN affiliation that was originally to have gone to WMWC. The owner of the low-power television station was Four Seasons Broadcasting; a partnership between Malibu Broadcasting in Cleveland, Ohio and Venture Technologies Group, LLC in Los Angeles, California. In November 2004, it was announced that WBQD would enter into a joint sales agreement with WQAD. On September 5, 2006, WBQD became a MyNetworkTV affiliate. It adopted the nickname "My TV 16" in reference to its channel number on Mediacom. WBQD's over-the-air signal did not reach the entire market due to its low-power status, but most viewers watched WBQD via its simulcast on this station, WQAD's third digital subchannel, which covers the entire market.

WBQD had a construction permit for a low-power digital transmitter on VHF channel 7 with the calls WBQD-LD. However, on June 30, 2009, Four Seasons Broadcasting, the owner of the station, filed for digital displacement relief and requested to move its digital channel assignment to UHF channel 14 instead. After an engineering study, it was determined that even as a low-power digital station, WBQD would cause and/or receive more than acceptable interference to and from KWWL in Waterloo, Iowa and KHQA-TV in Hannibal, Missouri, both of which are full power digital television stations that broadcast on channel 7 and had "flash-cut" to their former analog channels after the digital transition.

While transmitting an analog signal, Four Seasons Broadcasting initially operated WBQD outright from 2002 to 2004. However, they had WBQD operated through an  LMA by WQAD's former owners, The New York Times Company from 2004 to 2007, and by Local TV LLC from 2007 to 2011. This made it a sister outlet to WQAD and the two outlets shared studios on Park 16th Street, in the Prospect Park section of Moline.  However, some internal operations of WBQD (such as the maintenance of program logs) were actually based at the shared facilities of co-owned MyNetworkTV affiliate WAOE as well as ABC/CW affiliate WHOI and NBC affiliate WEEK-TV in East Peoria. WBQD's analog signal aired from a transmitter on 70th Street, next to Black Hawk College, near the Poplar Grove section of Moline.

On December 9, 2011, WBQD-LP notified the FCC that they went silent after losing their tower lease on the Black Hawk College campus in Moline. This occurred more than a year after Black Hawk College sold public broadcasting station WQPT-TV to Western Illinois University-Quad Cities though there is no indication of any connection to this. However, on June 6, 2013, the FCC cancelled the license of WBQD-LP, after it had been off the air for over a year. After WBQD went silent in December 2011, WQAD-DT3, which had for years been simulcasting WBQD's programming and MyNetworkTV affiliation in 480i 4:3 standard definition, began operating the Quad Cities' MyNetworkTV affiliation outright, rebranding it as "My TV 8.3" in reference to the station's virtual channel location. WQAD-DT3 would later tweak their branding to the current "My TV 8-3." As WQAD-DT3 had long been committed to broadcasting the schedule of MyNetworkTV and syndicated programming, and cable providers used 8.3 as their signal source for the station for years, the low-powered license for WBQD-LP was practically all but redundant. On October 9, 2012, the cable channel assignment for WQAD-DT3 on Mediacom moved from channel 16 to channel 3.

WMWC-TV was eventually granted its construction permit on July 20, 2007, and it finally signed on in August 2012 as a religious station affiliated with the Trinity Broadcasting Network (TBN). WMWC is broadcast in digital on VHF channel 8 (WQAD's former analog allocation), but through the use of PSIP remaps to virtual channel 53 as that was WMWC's pre-transition digital-only allocation. As of December 2012, WMWC is now a TBN owned-and-operated station.

On April 22, 2014, WQAD-DT3 began broadcasting in high definition, utilizing MyNetworkTV's default 720p format.

Programming

WQAD was one of the organizations which founded the Quad City Open Golf Tournament in 1971. The PGA Tour event is now called the John Deere Classic and has been the topic of special broadcasts on the television station for more than 35 years (though actual coverage of the tourney airs on Golf Channel and WHBF as of 2023). Quad Cities baby boomers fondly remember WQAD's weekly midnight Chuck Acri Creature Feature showing early Creature Features films including science fiction and monster movies. WQAD's early days are also remembered for being the local outlet for Romper Room and its host Miss Peggy. For much of the time since 1988, this station has carried the syndicated program Live with Kelly and Ryan weekday mornings at 9:00 a.m. Other syndicated programming on this station includes Pictionary, 25 Words or Less and Dr. Phil.

WQAD-DT3
Syndicated programming broadcast on WQAD-DT3 includes Pawn Stars, Steve Wilkos, You Bet Your Life, 25 Words or Less, and The King of Queens, among others.

Sports programming
WQAD-DT3 was previously affiliated with the Raycom Sports-operated ACC Network and aired live broadcasts of college football and basketball events from the Atlantic Coast Conference.

In early March 2015, it was announced that WQAD-DT3 would broadcast 45 Chicago Cubs games and 55 Chicago White Sox games to Quad City area baseball fans during the 2015 Major League Baseball season. This was due to the baseball games no longer being available on a national basis to cable and satellite viewers via WGN America. The origination of the baseball broadcasts was split between Chicago's CW affiliate (now independent station) WGN-TV (which was a direct sister station to WQAD under Tribune ownership) and ABC O&O WLS-TV. During the latter part of March 2015, it was revealed that the Quad Cities' CW affiliate KGCW would air the 24 remaining Cubs games not broadcast by WQAD-DT3. The broadcasts originating from WGN-TV were aired on WQAD-DT3 while the games broadcast by WLS-TV were aired on KGCW.

On October 4, 2015, WQAD-DT3 announced the expansion of their sports programming into the winter months which included televised broadcasts of the Chicago Bulls during the 2015–16 NBA season and the Chicago Blackhawks during the 2015–16 NHL season. 37 out of 46 telecasts (combining both teams) were aired on WQAD-DT3 with eight of the remaining nine telecasts airing on WQAD's main channel and one telecast airing on WQAD-DT2. As with the Cubs and White Sox baseball broadcasts, the originating station of the Bulls and Blackhawks telecasts was WGN-TV. Prior to the fall of 2015, select Bulls games were aired nationally on WGN America prior to that station canceling all of its sports telecasts.

News operation
The station began news operations from the first day it signed on-the-air in 1963. At times, it shares news stories with sister station WHO-TV in Des Moines, and since the merger of Local TV and Tribune in December 2013, can also utilize the resources of Chicago sister station WGN-TV to the east. WQAD is also affiliated with CNN. WQAD's early years are closely linked to the station's prominent anchor/reporter, Jim King. He began as the station's original sports anchor. By 1964, he became the station's main anchorman, a post he would hold until 1998, doubling as news director for most of that time. His sign-off at the end of his newscasts was always, "Thank you for inviting us into your home". King took cameras and gear to Vietnam for two tours of reporting on local troops. He was long the staple on the anchor desk and was known for his On the Road series of reports and for his longtime role as the emcee of the station's annual Muscular Dystrophy Association telethons from 1971 to 1998. He died of a heart attack while shoveling his sidewalk on January 2, 1999.

On September 4, 2007, WQAD's weeknight 6 o'clock newscast started re-airing on WBQD at 9:00 p.m. Its hour-long midday newscast, News 8 at 11, debuted on September 22, 2008, anchored by the weekday morning team. The station had dropped its midday newscast called Newsday in 1998.

On August 6, 2010, it was announced that the station would enter into a news share agreement with Fox affiliate KLJB. This resulted in a nightly prime time broadcast at 9:00 p.m. for a half-hour on that station on September 6. Previously, KLJB had its prime time broadcasts produced by the Independent News Network which is based in Davenport. This agreement ended on December 31, 2012 when KLJB entered a news share agreement with competitor KWQC-TV which then began producing the 9:00 p.m. newscasts for KLJB.  On December 30, 2015, the agreement between KWQC and KLJB ended and on December 31, 2015, WHBF-TV began producing a one-hour 9:00 p.m. newscast for KLJB.

On September 12, 2011, WQAD's news operation upgraded its newscasts to high definition becoming the last in the market to do so.

On January 4, 2016, WQAD began producing a new live half-hour 9:00 p.m. newscast for WQAD-DT3. The new 9:00 p.m. broadcast competes directly against the 9:00 p.m. newscast on Marshall Broadcasting-owned Fox affiliate KLJB which has its newscasts produced by current SSA partner and Nexstar sister station WHBF-TV.

Notable former on-air staff

 Hoda Kotb – now co-anchor of Today

Technical information

Subchannels
The station's digital signal is multiplexed:

The "Quad Cities Weather Channel" was a 24-hour weather service provided by WQAD and had been available to television viewers on digital channel 8.2 and on Mediacom channel 14. This was created in 2001 and featured its "Exclusive Live Triple Doppler" and weather updates every fifteen minutes. On March 5, 2011, WQAD discontinued the "Quad Cities Weather Channel" and digital channel 8.2 became affiliated with Antenna TV.

Analog-to-digital conversion
WQAD-TV shut down its analog signal, over VHF channel 8, at 3:59 a.m. on June 12, 2009, the official date in which full-power television stations in the United States transitioned from analog to digital broadcasts under federal mandate. The station's digital signal remained on its pre-transition UHF channel 38. Through the use of PSIP, digital television receivers display the station's virtual channel as its former VHF analog channel 8. Also at the same time, the "WQAD-TV" call sign was transferred from now-defunct analog channel 8 to digital channel 38 and the "WQAD-DT" calls were discontinued.

References

External links
WQAD.com - Official WQAD-TV website
mytv8-3.com - Official WQAD-DT3 website

ABC network affiliates
Television channels and stations established in 1963
Television stations in the Quad Cities
Tegna Inc.
MyNetworkTV affiliates
Antenna TV affiliates
True Crime Network affiliates
Twist (TV network) affiliates
Quest (American TV network) affiliates
1963 establishments in Illinois
Companies based in Rock Island County, Illinois